Intergroup Financial Services (IFS) is a Peruvian financial holding based in Panama, controller of Interbank and Interseguro. It is headquartered in Panama City, but its subsidiaries are based in Lima.

IFS was founded in 2006 as part of corporate restructuring of the Interbank, this simplifies the structure reorganization of the group and created the IFS to group the assets in which the Group operates in the financial industry in Peru: Interbank and Interseguro.

References 

Companies of Peru